"Fading Like a Flower (Every Time You Leave)" is a song by Swedish pop rock duo Roxette from their third studio album, Joyride (1991). Written by Per Gessle and produced by Clarence Öfwerman, the song was released as the second single from Joyride on 29 April 1991 by EMI Records. It became the duo's fifth consecutive top-10 hit single in the United States, peaking at number two on the Billboard Hot 100. The song reached the top 10 in an additional 12 countries.

Composition
According to Ultimate Guitar, the song is written in common time with a moderately fast tempo of 105 beats per minute. It is a piano-based rock ballad in the key of F which modulates a step up to G halfway through the song. The track follows a basic chord sequence of Am–Em–Am–C–G–Am–Em–D in each verse. The first two lines of each chorus have a progression of C–F–Am–G–C–F–G–C, with the second half of the chorus amending the sequence to a shortened C–F–Am–G–F–G. The bridge consists of three repetitions of Am–G–C–D followed by a progression of E–E7–Am–C–G–Am. The duo later recorded a Spanish version of the song for their 1996 compilation album Baladas en Español.

Critical reception
in his review of Joyride, AllMusic editor Bryan Buss described the song as an "insistent rock ballad" and "painfully pretty". Larry Flick from Billboard wrote that the duo "slow the pace down" for a "familiar power ballad that should push all the right buttons". Swedish newspaper Expressen called it a "powerful ballad" and compared it to "Listen to Your Heart". Dave Sholin from the Gavin Report commented, "In a Top 40 world starved for true pop music, the arrival of a new release by these two Swedish melody makers deserves bells, whistles and every other type of fanfare imaginable. Choosing a favorite from among their dazzling catalog of hits is an impossible task, and once again Per and Marie top themselves with an outstanding example of what hit mass appeal music is all about".

Norwegian newspaper Glåmdalen stated that "Fading Like a Flower (Every Time You Leave)" is one of the best songs on the Joyride album." Göteborgsposten described it as a "Def Leppard-like ballad", while I Dag called it a "pompous arena ballad". Pan-European magazine Music & Media wrote that it's a "melancholic ballad". Brendon Veevers from Renowned for Sound said that it is "pure gold", adding that "though its a ballad and though it touches an emotional nerve, it is also uplifting in its delivery with Per's masterful guitar work and Marie's exquisite vocals uniting perfectly here." J.D. Considine from Rolling Stone noted Fredriksson's "vocal fire-work" on the song.

Chart performance
Although not as successful as their previous single "Joyride", the song was a top-ten hit in numerous countries. It remains the duo's highest-peaking single ever on the Irish Singles Chart, peaking at number four. "Listen to Your Heart", "It Must Have Been Love" and "Almost Unreal" all peaked at number five. On the UK Singles Chart, "Fading Like a Flower (Every Time You Leave)" peaked at position number 12. It charted highest in North America, peaking at position number two in Canada and the United States, where it was held off the top spot in both countries by Bryan Adams's "(Everything I Do) I Do It for You". It became Roxette's sixth and last US top 10 hit.

Music video
The accompanying music video for "Fading Like a Flower (Every Time You Leave)" was shot mostly in the Gamla stan area of Stockholm and features images of Stockholm City Hall.

Track listing and formats
All songs written and composed by Per Gessle.

 7-inch and cassette single (Sweden 1364047 · UK TCEM190 · US 4KM-50355)
 "Fading Like a Flower (Every Time You Leave)" – 3:51
 "I Remember You" – 3:55

 12-inch single (Europe 1364046)
 "Fading Like a Flower (Every Time You Leave)" – 3:51
 "I Remember You" – 3:55
 "Fading Like a Flower (Every Time You Leave)" (Gatica Mix) – 3:57

 CD single (Europe 1364042)
 "Fading Like a Flower (Every Time You Leave)" – 3:51
 "I Remember You" – 3:55
 "Physical Fascination" (Extended/Guitar Solo Version) – 4:00
 "Fading Like a Flower (Every Time You Leave)" (Gatica Mix) – 3:57

Credits and personnel
Credits are adapted from the liner notes of The Ballad Hits.

Studios
 Recorded in July 1990 at EMI Studios (Stockholm, Sweden)
 Mixed at EMI Studios (Stockholm, Sweden)

Musicians
 Marie Fredriksson – lead and backing vocals
 Per Gessle – backing vocals, mixing
 Anders Herrlin – programming, engineering
 Jonas Isacsson – electric guitar
 Clarence Öfwerman – keyboards, programming, production, mixing
 Staffan Öfwerman – backing vocals
 Alar Suurna – mixing, engineering

Charts

Weekly charts

Year-end charts

Release history

Dancing DJs vs. Roxette (2005)

In 2005, the song was remixed by British dance act Dancing DJs. Credited as Dancing DJs vs Roxette, the remix charted in numerous territories, including Finland, Ireland, Sweden and the UK.

Formats and track listings
 CD single
 Digital download
 "Fading Like a Flower" (Dancing DJs Remix - Radio Edit) – 3:05
 "Fading Like a Flower" (Hardino Mix) – 6:05
 "Fading Like a Flower" (Dancing DJs Remix - Extended Mix) – 6:10
 "Fading Like a Flower" (Alex K Remix) – 6:08
 "Fading Like a Flower" (Discode Remix) – 6:30
 "Fading Like a Flower" (Alex K Bounce Remix) – 5:46

Charts

Other cover versions
 A cover of the song was released by Swedish artist Frida Öhrn in 2020.
 A Happy Hardcore cover by Rob IYF and Al Storm featuring Lacie was released in April 2022.

See also
 List of European number-one airplay songs of the 1990s

References

1991 singles
1990s ballads
Roxette songs
Songs written by Per Gessle
1991 songs
EMI Records singles
Pop ballads
Rock ballads